This is the videography by South Korean six-member boy band Shinhwa. Formed in 1998 under SM Entertainment, the band consists of Eric Mun, Lee Min-woo, Kim Dong-wan, Shin Hye-sung, Jun Jin and Andy Lee. They moved to Good Entertainment in July 2003, upon the expiration of their contract. In 2011, after a four-year hiatus, during which they served individual mandatory military services, they formed the Shinhwa Company to continue to perform together. This list the official music videos released by SM Entertainment, Good Entertainment and Shinhwa Company.

Music videos

Video albums

Concert tour videos

Documentaries

Music video compilations

Notes
 A  There are no publicly available records for Japan's Oricon chart prior to mid-2005.
 B  These songs, originally titled in Korean, have no official English titles.  Therefore, the translations provided here may differ from those in other sources.

References

External links
 Shincom Entertainment official YouTube Channel

Videographies of South Korean artists
Videography